This is a list of films produced by the Tollywood film industry based in Hyderabad in the year 1942.

References

External links
 Earliest Telugu language films at IMDb.com (74 to 81)

1942
Telugu
Telugu films